"Last Kiss" is a song released by Wayne Cochran in 1961 on the Gala label. It failed to do well on the charts. Cochran subsequently re-recorded his song for the King label in 1963. It was revived by J. Frank Wilson and the Cavaliers, who took it to number two on the Billboard Hot 100 charts. Wednesday, Pearl Jam, and several international artists also covered the song, with varying degrees of success. The song was one of several teen tragedy songs from that period.

Lyrical content
The narrator borrows his father's car to take his girlfriend out on a date, and comes upon a stalled car in the road. Unable to stop, the narrator swerves to the right to avoid it, losing control and crashing violently in the process, knocking his girlfriend and him unconscious. The narrator later regains consciousness in the midst of a rainstorm, and finds several people at the scene of the accident. While partially blinded by the blood flowing from his injuries, the narrator is able to find his girlfriend, still lying unconscious. When he cradles his girlfriend lovingly in his arms, she regains partial consciousness, smiling and asking the narrator to "hold me, darling, for a little while." The narrator then gives her the titular "last kiss" as she fades into death.

In the song's chorus, the narrator vows to be a good person so that he may reunite with his love when his time comes, believing she has made it into Heaven.

Original version
By Wayne Cochran, Joe Carpenter, Randall Hoyal, and Bobby McGlon (1961)

In the summer of 1961, four friends traveled to the University of Georgia in Athens, Georgia, to record a song Wayne Cochran had written, with Joe Carpenter, Randall Hoyal, and Bobby McGlon, called "Last Kiss".  Cochran (vocals), Carpenter (guitar), Bobby Rakestraw (bass), and Jerry Reppert (drums) recorded the song for the Gala label, a small label based in Vidalia. When the labels for the 45s, Gala #117, were printed, the names of co-writers Joe Carpenter, Randall Hoyal, and Bobby McGlon were left off.  Cochran evidently never asked Gala to change the label to include the other names; to this day, Cochran is the only one credited with writing "Last Kiss".

Cochran went on to re-record the song for release on Aire Records (1962), in a slightly different tempo, with some changes to the lyrics and for re-release on King Records in 1963. In all, Cochran recorded four versions of the song, the original, Gala #117, Boblo Records #101, King Records #5856, and Aire Records #150, released as "Last Kiss" b/w "Edge of the Sea", with Cochran sharing vocals with an unnamed male vocalist. The Aire disc was easily the most different version of all, with heavy reverb and a staccato drumbeat. Aire Records, located in Dublin, Georgia, credited the song to Perry Music, as did the Gala recording. The Boblo disc credited "Last Kiss" to Macon Music, while the King record cited Boblo-BMI. The Boblo record featured "Last Kiss II" b/w "Hey! Baby" (Boblo 101-A), produced by Bobby Smith, offering another take on the song, with different lyrics, a faster tempo, and different instrumentation. A fifth version of the song was cobbled from the Boblo recording, rechanneled for stereo, on Radical Musik Records, probably around 1973.

On September 18, 1961, Billboard Music Week printed a review of the song "Last Kiss" and gave it three stars. None of the records charted.

Billboard had kind words for the B-side, in its review of "Last Kiss" — giving four stars to the song called "Funny Feeling", on the flip side, written by Joe Carpenter and Milt "Pete" Skelton. The reviewer said, "Blues, chanted in relaxed style, with a funky guitar backing. Derivative but a good job."

J. Frank Wilson and the Cavaliers version

"Last Kiss" was recorded in August 1964 by the Cavaliers of San Angelo, Texas, with J. Frank Wilson as singer. The record was first released locally, on Le Cam Records (#722), then on Tamara Records (#761), becoming a local hit. Eventually released on Josie Records (#923), a subsidiary of semimajor label Jubilee Records, the record became a national hit in the fall of 1964.

Released on September 5, 1964, Josie 923 spent 15 weeks on the charts, reaching number two on November 7. "Last Kiss" spent eight weeks in the top 10; the record sold over one million copies, earning the band a gold record. The Le Cam #722-A disc running time is 2:14, while both the Tamara Records #761 release and the Josie Records #923 platter have a time of 2:25.

On a concert trip to Ohio, the band had just left Parkersburg, West Virginia, heading to Lima, Ohio, for a performance at the Candy Cane Club. About 5:15 am, Roush apparently fell asleep at the wheel. The car drifted across the centerline and rammed head-on into a trailer truck. Roush was killed, but Wilson, sitting in the front seat, and Bobby Wood (vocalist/piano) from Memphis, sitting in the back, survived with serious injuries, including broken ribs and a broken ankle. Wilson went on with the tour, though, taking only a week off. People still remember him coming out on the stage on crutches to sing "Last Kiss" and "Hey, Little One". The accident had a curious effect on record sales, nevertheless, pushing the song to number two (it had previously stalled at number three) on the national charts.

The Last Kiss album cover shows Wilson kneeling over the young woman portraying the dying girl. Supposedly, first printings of the cover showed blood trickling down the girl's face, but it was air-brushed out by the record company for fear that alienating parents would limit sales of the album.

Wilson, with or without the Cavaliers, continued to record until 1978. He died on October 4, 1991, due to alcoholism. He was 49 years old.

Chart performance

Weekly charts

Year-end charts

Wednesday version

In 1973, "Last Kiss" was covered by the Canadian group Wednesday.  Their version reached number two in Canada and number 34 in the United States. It is ranked as the 27th-biggest Canadian hit of 1973.  Their version climbed up the charts very slowly, and spent three weeks longer on the American charts than the Cavaliers' much bigger hit.

As a result of the popularity of Wednesday's rendition, the Cavaliers' version was re-released (Virgo 506) at the end of 1973. It reached number 92 in January 1974, spending five weeks on the Billboard Hot 100.  The original hit version recharted five weeks after the version by Wednesday entered the charts.

Charts

Weekly charts

Year-end charts

Pearl Jam version
 

"Last Kiss" was also covered by American rock band Pearl Jam for the 1999 charity album No Boundaries: A Benefit for the Kosovar Refugees. It would later appear on the group's 2003 rarities album Lost Dogs. This version was successful, especially in Australia, where it topped the ARIA Singles Chart for seven weeks. It also reached number one in Iceland for six weeks and peaked at number two in the United States and Canada, making it the band's highest-charting single in either country.

Origin and recording
The idea to cover "Last Kiss" came about after vocalist Eddie Vedder found an old record of the song at the Fremont Antique Mall in Seattle, Washington. He convinced the rest of the band to try out the song, and it was performed a few times on the band's 1998 tour. The band eventually recorded the song at a soundcheck at the Merriweather Post Pavilion in Columbia, Maryland, in September of that year and released it as a 1998 fan club Christmas single. The band spent only a few thousand dollars mixing the song. Bassist Jeff Ament said, "It was the most minimalist recording we've ever done."

Release and reception
In 1998, the cover of "Last Kiss" began to be played by radio stations and was ultimately put into heavy rotation across the US. By popular demand, the cover was released to the public as a single on June 8, 1999. The proceeds went to the aid of refugees of the Kosovo War. The cover was featured on the 1999 charity compilation album, No Boundaries: A Benefit for the Kosovar Refugees. The song helped earn about $10 million for Kosovo relief.

The cover reached number two on the US Billboard Hot 100, giving Pearl Jam's their highest-peaking song on the Billboard Hot 100. It peaked at number four on the Top 40 Mainstream chart. The song reached number five on the Billboard Mainstream Rock Tracks chart and number two on the Billboard Modern Rock Tracks chart. The "Last Kiss" single has been certified gold by the RIAA.

Outside the United States, the song reached number two on the Canadian RPM Top Singles chart and became the band's highest-charting song in Canada. It later charted on the RPM Rock Report, where it reached number four and stayed there for two weeks. In Europe, "Last Kiss" reached number 42 in the United Kingdom and number 77 in the Netherlands. In Australasia, "Last Kiss" peaked atop the Australian ARIA Singles Chart for seven weeks and became a top-20 success in New Zealand. It also reached number one in Iceland, staying at the summit for six weeks.

Christopher John Farley of Time said, "It's a spare, morose song with Vedder's voice warbling lovelorn over a straight-ahead drum beat. Going back to basics has put Pearl Jam back on top." Regarding the cover, guitarist Stone Gossard said, "You can try album after album to write a hit and spend months getting drum sounds and rewriting lyrics, or you can go to a used record store and pick out a single and fall in love with it." Pearl Jam included "Last Kiss" on the 2003 B-sides and rarities album, Lost Dogs, and on the 2004 greatest hits album, rearviewmirror (Greatest Hits 1991–2003).

Live performances
Pearl Jam first performed its cover of "Last Kiss" live at the band's May 7, 1998, concert in Seattle, at ARO.space. Live performances by Pearl Jam of "Last Kiss" can be found on various official bootlegs and the Live at the Gorge 05/06 box set.

Track listing
CD, 7-inch, and cassette single
 "Last Kiss" (Wayne Cochran) – 3:15
 "Soldier of Love" (Buzz Cason, Tony Moon) – 2:54

Charts

Weekly charts

Year-end charts

Decade-end charts

Certifications

Release history

Other cover versions
The song has a long tradition in Latin American popular music.  The most popular version was recorded in 1965 by Mexican singer Polo (ex-member of Los Apson) with the title of "El Último Beso" in Spanish, translated by Mexican TV director and tennis teacher Omero Gonzalez, this Spanish version has been covered by several bands, notably by singer Alci Acosta who had a hit in 1967 in Colombia, as well as José "Joseíto" Martínez in 1990, the song with which he won a Congo de Oro in the Barranquilla Carnival. Mexican singer-songwriter Gloria Trevi released her version of the song in 1989, peaking at number 36 on the Billboard Hot Latin Songs chart.

References

1961 songs
1963 singles
1964 singles
1973 singles
1999 singles
Epic Records singles
J. Frank Wilson and the Cavaliers songs
King Records (United States) singles
Cashbox number-one singles
Number-one singles in Australia
Number-one singles in Iceland
Pearl Jam songs
Songs inspired by deaths
Songs about kissing
Teenage tragedy songs
Vehicle wreck ballads
Wayne Cochran songs
Wednesday (band) songs